Egremont was a parliamentary constituency centred on the town of Egremont in  Cumberland.  It returned one Member of Parliament (MP) to the House of Commons of the Parliament of the United Kingdom, elected by the first past the post system.

Boundaries
This county constituency was a division of the historic county of Cumberland in North West England. Although the area had an alternative designation of the Western division of the county, it was actually the southernmost constituency in the county, with the sea to the south and west and the boundaries with the historic counties of Lancashire and Westmorland to the east. The Cumberland divisions of Cockermouth and Penrith were to the north.

The borough constituency of Whitehaven was, apart from the sea to its west, enclaved in the north west part of this constituency. Non resident freeholders from the town were qualified to vote in the county seat. In 1918 the Whitehaven borough constituency and the Egremont county division were, in effect, merged to form a new Whitehaven county constituency.

History
Egremont was represented as a two-member constituency, in the Model Parliament of 1295. The town was subsequently represented only as part of the county of Cumberland.

From 1832 until 1885 the historic county of Cumberland was split for parliamentary purposes into two county divisions. These were East Cumberland (with a place of election, in the part of the period when all votes were still cast in one location in a constituency, at Carlisle) and West Cumberland (where voting took place at Cockermouth). Each division returned two members to Parliament.

The parliamentary borough included in the area of the county divisions (whose non-resident 40 shilling freeholders voted in the county constituency) were for the East division; Carlisle and for the West division; Cockermouth and Whitehaven. (Source: Stooks Smith).

The constituency was created by the Redistribution of Seats Act 1885 for the 1885 general election, and abolished for the 1918 general election. The division was named after the small town of Egremont.

It was an area with a mixed economy. Ironstone mining and a blast furnace employed many people and there were some inhabitants engaged in shipbuilding. It was estimated that in the late nineteenth century, 1 in 11 of the adult male population of Cumberland worked in mining and 1 in 5 in heavy industry. There were also a lot of small freehold farmers in the more rural parts of the constituency, who were thought to be the source of Conservative strength at elections.

The area usually returned Conservative Members of Parliament, but was prepared to elect a Liberal in a good year for that party. Pelling suggests that the substantial Irish element in the divisions population (who had arrived to work as labourers as the county industrialised in the 1860s) were responsible for Liberal victories, at elections when Irish Nationalists were strongly supporting the Liberals. In any event the Conservatives won six and the Liberals two of the seats eight general elections.

Members of Parliament

Note:-
 a Peer of Ireland when a member of the House of Commons.

Elections

Elections in the 1880s

Elections in the 1890s

Elections in the 1900s

Elections in the 1910s 

General Election 1914–15:

Another General Election was required to take place before the end of 1915. The political parties had been making preparations for an election to take place and by the July 1914, the following candidates had been selected; 
Unionist: James Grant
Liberal:

See also

 Parliamentary Franchise in the United Kingdom 1885-1918

References

 Boundaries of Parliamentary Constituencies 1885-1972, compiled and edited by F.W.S. Craig (Parliamentary Reference Publications 1972)
 British Parliamentary Election Results 1885-1918, compiled and edited by F.W.S. Craig (Macmillan Press 1974)
 The Parliaments of England by Henry Stooks Smith (1st edition published in three volumes 1844–50), second edition edited (in one volume) by F.W.S. Craig (Political Reference Publications 1973)
 Social Geography of British Elections 1885-1910. by Henry Pelling (Macmillan 1967)

Politics of Cumbria
Parliamentary constituencies in North West England (historic)
Constituencies of the Parliament of the United Kingdom established in 1295
Constituencies of the Parliament of the United Kingdom established in 1885
Constituencies of the Parliament of the United Kingdom disestablished in 1918